Malcolm George Munro (born 21 May 1953) is an English former professional footballer who played in the Football League for Leicester City as a central defender.

Career statistics

References

1953 births
Living people
English footballers
Leicester City F.C. players
English Football League players
People from Arlesey
Association football central defenders
Sportspeople from Melton Mowbray
Footballers from Leicestershire